Catocala texanae, the Texan underwing, is a moth of the family Erebidae. The species was first described by George Hazen French in 1902. It is found in the US state of Texas.

Adults are on wing from May to June. There is probably one generation per year.

References

External links
Oehlke, Bill. "Catocala texanae French, 1902". The Catocala Website. Retrieved October 22, 2019.

Moths described in 1902
texanae
Moths of North America